is a railway station in Abeno-ku, Osaka, Osaka Prefecture, Japan, on the Kintetsu Minami Osaka Line.

Layout
Koboreguchi Station has two side platforms on the 4th level serving a track each.

Platforms

Surrounding
 Bishōen Station (JR Hanwa Line)

Adjacent stations

|-
!colspan=5|Kintetsu

External links
 Koboreguchi Station (Kintetsu Corporation) (Japanese)

Abeno-ku, Osaka
Railway stations in Japan opened in 1923
Railway stations in Osaka